This is a list of monarchs of Persia (or monarchs of the Iranic peoples, in present-day Iran), some of whom were known by the royal title Shah or Shahanshah. This list starts from the establishment of the Medes around 671 BCE until the deposition of the Pahlavi dynasty in 1979 CE.

Median Dynasty (671–549 BC)

Achaemenis kingdom (705–559 BC)

Achaemenid Empire (559–334/327 BC) 

Note: Ancient Persia is generally agreed to have ended with the collapse of the Achaemenid dynasty as a result of the Wars of Alexander the Great.

Macedonian Empire (336–306 BC)

Seleucid Empire (311–129 BC)

Fratarakas

The Fratarakas appear to have been Governors of the Seleucid Empire.
{| class="wikitable"
! colspan=2| Name
! Date
! Coinage
! Family Relations
! Note
|-
| 1
| Bagadates/ Baydād (bgdt)
| 3rd century BC
|
| Fratarakā dynasty – son of Baykard
| Governor of the Seleucid Empire. Coin legend bgdt prtrk' zy 'lhy ("Baydād, fratarakā of the gods") in Aramaic.
|-
| 2
| Ardakhshir I (rtḥštry)
| mid-3rd century BC
|
| Fratarakā dynasty
| Governor of the Seleucid Empire
|-
| 3
| Vahbarz (whwbrz – called Oborzos in Polyenus 7.40)
| mid-3rd century BC 
|
| Fratarakā dynasty
| Governor of the Seleucid Empire
|-
| 4
| Vādfradād I (wtprdt)
| 3rd century BC
|
| Fratarakā dynasty – son of Vahbarz 
| Governor of the Seleucid Empire
|-
| 5
| Vadfradad II 
| c. 140 BC
|
| Fratarakā dynasty
| Governor of the Seleucid Empire. Transition period. Eagle emblem on top of stylized kyrbasia. Aramaic coin legend wtprdt [p]rtrk' zy 'ly ("Vādfradād, frataraka of the gods").
|-
| 6
| 'Unknown king I' (Syknlt?) 
| 2nd half of 2nd century BC
|
| ?
| Transition period. No inscription on coinage.
|-
|}

Kings of Persis

{| class="wikitable"
! colspan=2| Name
! Date
! Coinage
! Family Relations
! Note
|-
| 7
| Darayan I
| 2nd century BC (end)
|
| ?
| Darev I and his successors were sub-kings of the Parthian Empire. Crescent emblem on top of stylized kyrbasia. Aramaic coin legend d’ryw mlk (𐡃𐡀𐡓𐡉𐡅 𐡌𐡋𐡊, "King Darius").
|-
| 8
| Wadfradad III 
| 1st century BC (1st half)
|
| ?
| Sub-king of the Parthian Empire. Coin legend wtprdt mlk (𐡅𐡕𐡐𐡓𐡃𐡕 𐡌𐡋𐡊, "King Vadfradad") in Aramaic script.
|-
| 9
| Darev II 
| 1st century BC
|
| son of Vadfradad III 
|Sub-king of the Parthian Empire. Aramaic coin legend d’ryw mlk brh wtprdt mlk ("King Darius, son of King Vadfradad"). 
|-
| 10
| Ardakhshir II 
| 1st century BC (2nd half)
|
| son of Darev II 
| Sub-king of the Parthian Empire. Killed by his brother Vahshir I 
|-
| 11
| Vahšīr/ Vahshir I (Oxathres)
| 1st century BC (2nd half)
|
| son of Darev II 
| Sub-king of the Parthian Empire
|-
| 12
| Pakor I 
| 1st century AD (1st half)
|
| son of Vahshir I 
| Sub-king of the Parthian Empire
|-
| 13
| Pakor II 
| 1st century AD (1st half)
|
| ?
| Sub-king of the Parthian Empire
|-
| 14
| Nambed 
| 1st century AD (mid)
|
| son of Ardashir II 
| Sub-king of the Parthian Empire
|-
| 15
| Napad 
| 1st century AD (2nd half)
|
| son of Nambed 
| Sub-king of the Parthian Empire
|-
| 16
| 'Unknown king II' 
| 1st century AD (end)
|
| ?
| Sub-king of the Parthian Empire
|-
| 17
| Vadfradad IV 
| 2nd century AD (1st half)
|
| ?
| Sub-king of the Parthian Empire
|-
| 18
| Manchihr I 
| 2nd century AD (1st half)
|
| ?
| Sub-king of the Parthian Empire
|-
| 19
| Ardashir III 
| 2nd century AD (1st half)
|
| son of Manchihr I 
| Sub-king of the Parthian Empire
|-
| 20
| Manchihr II 
| 2nd century AD (mid)
|
| son of Ardashir III
| Sub-king of the Parthian Empire
|-
| 21
| 'Unknown king III'/tentatively Pakor III
| 2nd century AD (2nd half)
|
| ?
| Sub-king of the Parthian Empire
|-
| 22
| Manchihr III 
| 2nd century AD (2nd half)
|
| son of Manchihr II
| Sub-king of the Parthian Empire
|-
| 23
| Ardashir IV 
| 2nd century AD (end)
|
| son of Manchihr III 
| Sub-king of the Parthian Empire
|-
| 24
| Vahshir II (Oxathres)
| c. 206–210 AD
|
| ?
| Sub-king of the Parthian Empire. The last of Bazarangids.
|-
| 25
| Shapur
| 3rd century AD (beg.)
|
| Brother of the first Sasanian, Ardashir I
| Sub-king of the Parthian Empire
|-
|26
|Ardashir V(Sasanian Dynasty Ardashir I)
| 3rd century AD (beg.)
|
|First Sasanian ruler, under the name of Ardashir I
|Sub-king of the Parthian Empire
|-
|}

Parthian Empire (247 BC – AD 228)

The Seleucid dynasty gradually lost control of Persia. In 253, the Arsacid dynasty established itself in Parthia. The Parthians gradually expanded their control, until by the mid-2nd century BC, the Seleucids had completely lost control of Persia. Control of eastern territories was permanently lost by Antiochus VII in 129 BC.

For more comprehensive lists of kings, queens, sub-kings and sub-queens of this Era see:
List of rulers of Parthian sub-kingdoms

 Sasanian Empire (224–651) Note: Classical Persia is generally agreed to have ended with the collapse of the Sasanian Empire as a result of the Muslim conquest of Persia.

 Dabuyid Kingdom (642–760) 

A Zoroastrian Persian dynasty that held power in the north for over a century before finally falling to the Abbasid Caliphate.

Rashidun Caliphate (642–661)

For more comprehensive lists of kings and sub-kings of this Era see:
Muslim dynasties of Iran

 Umayyad Caliphate (661–750) 

For more comprehensive lists of kings and sub-kings of this Era see:
Islamic dynasties of Iran

Notable Governors

 Abbasid Caliphate (750–819) 

For more comprehensive lists of kings and sub-kings of this Era see:
Muslim dynasties of Iran

 Notable Governors 

Samanid Empire (819–999)

For more comprehensive lists of kings and sub-kings of this Era see:
Muslim dynasties of Iran

 Saffarid Kingdom (861–1003) 

For more comprehensive lists of kings and sub-kings of this Era see:
Muslim dynasties of Iran

Ghurid Kingdom (879–1215)

For more comprehensive lists of kings and sub-kings of this Era see:
Muslim dynasties of Iran

Ziyarid Kingdom (928–1043)

Buyid Kingdom (934–1062)

The Buyid Kingdom was divided into a number of separate emirates, of which the most important were Fars, Ray, and Iraq. Generally, one of the emirs held a sort of primus inter pares supremacy over the rest, which would be marked by titles like Amir al-umara and Shahanshah.

For more comprehensive lists of kings and sub-kings of this Era see:
Muslim dynasties of Iran

Ghaznavids Empire (977–1186)

For more comprehensive lists of kings and sub-kings of this Era see:
Muslim dynasties of Iran

Seljuk Empire (1029–1194)

For more comprehensive lists of kings and sub-kings of this Era see:
Muslim dynasties of Iran

 Khwarazmian Empire (1153–1220) 

An empire built from Khwarezm, covering part of Iran and neighbouring Central Asia.

For more comprehensive lists of kings and sub-kings of this Era see:
Islamic dynasties of Iran

 Mongol Empire (1220–1256) 

For more comprehensive lists of kings and sub-kings of this Era see:
Muslim dynasties of Iran

 Ilkhanate  (1256–1357) 

 Ilkhanate (1256–1335) 

 Sarbadars (1332–1386) 

 Chobanids (1335–1357) 

 Jalayirids (1335–1432) 

 Injuids (1335–1357) 

 Muzaffarids (1314–1393) 

Timurid Empire (1370–1467)

 Qara Qoyunlu and Aq Qoyunlu (1375–1497) 

 Qara Qoyunlu 

 Aq Quyunlu 

Sources:H.R. Roemer, "The Safavid Period", in Cambridge History of Iran, Vol. VI, Cambridge University Press 1986, p. 339: "Further evidence of a desire to follow in the line of Turkmen rulers is Ismail's assumption of the title 'Padishah-i-Iran', previously held by Uzun Hasan."Note: Medieval Persia is generally agreed to have ended with the rise of the Safavid Empire'''''

Safavid Empire (1501–1736)

Afsharid Empire (1736–1796)

Zand Kingdom (1751–1794)

Qajar Empire (1794–1925)

Pahlavi Empire (1925–1979)

See also
 Achaemenid Empire
 Great Civilization
 History of Iran
 List of ancient Persians
 List of royal consorts of Persia
 Monarchism in Iran
 2,500-year celebration of the Persian Empire
 List of rulers of the pre-Achaemenid kingdoms of Iran
 List of rulers of Parthian sub-kingdoms
 Islamic dynasties of Iran

Notes and references

Bibliography

 Assar, G.R.F., "Genealogy & Coinage of the Early Parthian Rulers. I", Parthica, 6, 2004, pp. 69–93.
 Assar, G.R.F., "Genealogy & Coinage of the Early Parthian Rulers, II a revised stemma", Parthica, 7, 2005, pp. 29–63.
 Assar, G.R.F., "Moses of Choren & the Early Parthian Chronology", Electrum, vol. 11, 2006, pp. 61–86.
 Assar, G.R.F., "A Revised Parthian Chronology of the Period 165–91 B.C.", Electrum, vol. 11, 2006, pp. 87–158.
 Assar, G.R.F., "A Revised Parthian Chronology of the Period 91–55 B.C.", Parthica, 8, 2006, pp. 55–104.
 Briant, Pierre, "From Cyrus to Alexander: A History of the Persian Empire", 2002.
 Cameron, George, "History of Early Iran", Chicago, 1936 (repr., Chicago, 1969; tr. E.-J. Levin, L’histoire de l’Iran antique, Paris, 1937; tr. H. Anusheh, ایران در سپیده دم تاریخ, Tehran, 1993)
 D’yakonov, I. M., "Istoriya Midii ot drevenĭshikh vremen do kontsa IV beka de e.E" (The history of Media from ancient times to the end of the 4th century BC), Moscow and Leningrad, 1956; tr. Karim Kešāvarz as Tāriḵ-e Mād, Tehran, 1966.
 Dandamaev, Muhammad A., "Persien unter den ersten Achämeniden (6. Jahrhundert v. Chr.)", tr. Heinz-Dieter Pohl, Wiesbaden, 1976.
 Qashqai, H., "The successors of Mithridates II", Bulletin of Ancient Iranian History (UCLA), vol. 5, March 2009.(in Persian)
 Henkelman, wouter. Defining Neo-Elamite History. ARTA, 2003.
 Hinz, W., "The Lost World of Elam", London, 1972 (tr. F. Firuznia, دنیای گمشده ایلام, Tehran, 1992)
 Josephus Flavius, Antiquities of the Jews.
 Justi, Ferdinand, "Iranisches Namenbuch", Tehran, Asatir, 2003.
 Legrain, Leon, "Historical Fragments", Philadelphia, The University of Pennsylvania Museum Publications of the Babylonian Section, vol. XIII, 1922.
 Majidzadeh, Yusef, "History and civilization of Elam", Tehran, Iran University Press, 1991.
 Majidzadeh, Yusef, "History and civilization of Mesopotamia", Tehran, Iran University Press, 1997, vol.1.
 Miroschedji, P. de, 'La fin du royaume de l’Ansˇan et de Suse et la naissance de l’empire perse', 1985, ZA 75, pp. 265–306.
 Nöldeke, Theodor, "Geschichte der Perser und Araber zur Zeit der Sasaniden. Aus der arabischen Chronik des Tabari übersetzt" (1879)
 Olmstead, A. T., "History of the Persian Empire", Chicago, 1948
 Plutarch, Lives.
 Polybius, The Histories.
 Potts, D. T., The Archaeology of Elam, Cambridge University Press, 1999.
 Reade, Julian E. Elam after the Assyrian Sack of Susa in 647 B.C. NABU, 2000.
 Tacitus, The Annals.
 Tavernier, Jan. Some Thoughts on Neo-Elamite Chronology. ARTA, 2004.
 
 
 
 
 
 
 
 
 
 Vallat, Francois. Elam: The History of Elam. Encyclopædia Iranica, vol. VIII pp. 301–313. London/New York, 1998.
 Vallat, Francois. Shutruk-Nahunte, Shutur-Nahunte et l'imbroglio neo-elamite. NABU, 1995.
 Vallat, Francois. Le royaume elamite de SAMATI. NABU, 1996.
 Vallat, Francois. Les pretendus fonctionnaires Unsak des texts neo-elamites et achemenides. ARTA, 2002.
 Vallat, Francois. Le royaume elamite de Zamin et les 'Letters de Nineveh'. Iranica Antique, 33, 1998. pp. 95–106.

Iran history-related lists
Persia